is a Nippon Professional Baseball player. He previously played for 14 years with the Chiba Lotte Marines. 

His younger brother Shota was also a professional baseball player for the Marines.

On 9 December 2021, it was confirmed Omine would be signing a development contract with the Chunichi Dragons after his release from the Marines.

External links

NPB

References

Living people
1988 births
Baseball people from Okinawa Prefecture
Japanese baseball players
Nippon Professional Baseball pitchers
Chiba Lotte Marines players
Chunichi Dragons players